<mapframe
text="Crevichon"
width=250	
height=250	
zoom=14
latitude=49.462778
longitude=-2.464722/>
Crevichon is an islet off the west coast of Herm, immediately to the north of Jethou, in the Channel Islands

According to S. K. Kellett-Smith, it means "isle of crabs, crayfish or cranes". Like other names in the region, it is Norman in origin. A thousand years ago, the water level was ten feet lower, making these creatures far more abundant there.

Geography

History

A 16th-century drawing, now in the British Museum, shows Crevichon as apparently a wooded islet.

Prof. John Le Patourel, in The Building of Castle Cornet, mentions that in 1566 iron and hammers were taken to "Creavissham", and the island quarried for the castle. The quarry has been used intermittently since then, making the island less visible; to make up for that, a fifteen-foot marker was erected on its peak. Crevichon may have provided the granite for the steps of St Paul's Cathedral in London.

It is said that, in earlier times, pirates were hanged with chains both on Crevichon and on nearby Jethou.

Compton Mackenzie, former owner of Herm, called Crevichon "Merg" in his book Fairy Gold, whose setting is a fictionalised version of the islands.

Wrecks

In 1953, Victor Coysh says that he saw the remains of a German bomber, from the time of the occupation. The German plane that crashed on Crevichon on 19 November 1940, killing all its crew, was a He 111 that either a British night fighter shot down while the He 111 was flying from France to bomb the south coast of England, or that developed engine trouble on the way.

Other wrecks include the Courier, a Guernsey steamer, that grounded in 1905 with 80 passengers.

References
Forty, George (2005) Channel Islands at War: A German Perspective. (Ian Allan). 
 Channel Islets – Victor Coysh

Herm
Uninhabited islands of the Bailiwick of Guernsey